This page details the match results and statistics of the New Zealand national football B team from its first match in 1927 until the match against Wellington Phoenix FC in 2015.

Key

Key to matches
Att. = Match attendance
(H) = Home ground
(A) = Away ground
(N) = Neutral ground

Key to record by opponent
Pld = Games played
W = Games won
D = Games drawn
L = Games lost
GF = Goals for
GA = Goals against

A-International results

Results by year

See also
New Zealand national football team
New Zealand at the FIFA World Cup
New Zealand at the FIFA Confederations Cup
New Zealand at the OFC Nations Cup

References

B team results